World Innovation Forum (Kuala Lumpur)  is an annual conference held each year in Kuala Lumpur.  Past speakers at WIF-KL include current and former Malaysian Prime Ministers, Tun Dr. Mahathir bin Mohamad and Dato' Sri Haji Mohammad Najib bin Tun Haji Abdul Razak.

Description 

WIF-KL is a three-day annual conference and award ceremony held each year in Kuala Lumpur that discusses issues related to innovation.  In 2012, WIF-KL was the culmination of the Science and Innovation Movement.

WIF-KL 2012 

WIF-KL 2012 consisted of four core events and nine satellite events:

WIF-KL 2012 Core Event 

 KL Innovation Forum 2012 
 BioMalaysia Conference and Exhibition 2012 
 NanoMalaysia Summit and Expo 
 National Innovation Conference and Exhibition (NICE) 2012

WIF-KL 2012 Satellite Events 

TEDxMerdeka
Market Open Day (JEJAK INOVASI)
KidsInvent Finale
Asia Grassroot Innovation Design Competition and Forum  
21st Century Learning (Innovation in Education)  
Re:Generation and Transform and Roll Out Session   
International Symposium on Fostering Innovation in Developing Countries  
Cyber Security Malaysia Awards, Conference and Exhibition  
WIFKL Innovation Award

WIF-KL 2013 

The 2013 World Innovation Forum will be held at Kuala Lumpur Convention Centre on November 12–14, 2013.

Participants 

Past participants have included business leaders such as Mohd Yusoff Sulaiman and Wing K. Lee, as well as distinguished professors such as Datuk Seri Dr. Maximus Johnity Ongkili and Anil K. Gupta.

Organizers 

World Innovation Forum - Kuala Lumpur (WIF-KL) WIF-KL is organized by Malaysia's Ministry of Science, Technology and Innovation (MOSTI) and the Malaysian Foundation for Innovation (YIM).

References

External links 
 Official website
 World Innovation Forum - KL 2012 Picasa Photo Gallery
 Malaysian Foundation for Innovation Homepage
 Ministry of Science, Technology, and Innovation Homepage
 World Innovation Forum - KL Time Lapse
 Anil K. Gupta's thoughts on the importance of Innovation at WIF-KL 2012
 Interview with Wing K Lee - YTL Communications at WIF-KL 2012

Business conferences